Aguinaga is a surname of Basque origins. Notable people with the surname include:

Alejandro Aguinaga (born 1950), Peruvian physician and politician
Álex Aguinaga (born 1968), Ecuadorian footballer and manager
Daniel Aguiñaga (born 1994), Mexican footballer
Javi Martínez (Javier Martínez Aguinaga, born 1988), Spanish footballer
Juan Aguinaga (born 1978), Ecuadorian footballer
Marcela Aguiñaga (born 1973), Ecuadorian politician

Basque-language surnames